The Living Waters Lutheran College is an independent Lutheran school providing a Kindergarten to year 12 education to the communities of Baldivis, Secret Harbour, Port Kennedy, Mandurah and the surrounding areas of Western Australia.

Living Waters consists of three "schools" within one College:

- Early Learning Centre - Kindergarten and Pre-Primary
- Primary School - Year 1 to Year 6
- Secondary School - Year 7 - Year 12

Each "school" has its own identity and buildings within the college, as well as still being involved with the other schools through programs such as class buddies, collaborative teaching, interschool sports and whole college special events. Facilities include a chapel, Computer and Science Laboratories and a Gymnasium that doubles as a Performing Arts Centre, and other specialist areas for home economics, textiles, woodwork, metal work, ceramics, painting, etc. Specialist staff include a student and family counselor and a learning enrichment team to assist students needing further development or additional challenges.

External links
 

Private primary schools in Perth, Western Australia
Lutheran schools in Australia
Private secondary schools in Perth, Western Australia
High schools and secondary schools affiliated with the Lutheran Church
Elementary and primary schools affiliated with the Lutheran Church